McKay Avenue School is a former school and historic site in Edmonton, Alberta, Canada. The site is a Provincial and Municipal Historic Resource, and home to the Edmonton Public School Board's archives and museum.

History
The original one-room school house was constructed in 1881 on land donated by the Hudson's Bay Company, using funds raised by Matthew McCauley, Malcolm Groat and William Rowland. The smooth-finished wooden building featured a porch, double doors, eight large windows and  ceilings.

The growing population of Edmonton required the construction of a larger school house. Architect Henry Denny Johnson was contracted to design the three-storey, eight-room school on the site of the original 1881 school house. Johnson utilized the Richardsonian Romanesque architectural style. In 1904 R. J. Mason received the contract to build the school, and construction began later in the year with Governor General Lord Minto laying the cornerstone, and construction completed and opened on 1 September 1905, the same day the province of Alberta entered Confederation. Construction did not start on the Alberta Legislature Building until 1907, and was not completed until 1913, so the Legislative Assembly of Alberta used the McKay Avenue School for the first two sessions of the First Legislative Assembly of Alberta in 1906 and 1907. Important bills passed in those sessions include confirming Edmonton as the provincial capital, the founding of the University of Alberta, establishment of provincial courts, and the provision of charters for several railway companies. The school was named after Dr. William MacKay, a physician for the Hudson's Bay Company, although the building retains the misspelled McKay name.

With dwindling enrollment in the downtown Edmonton area, totaling 59 in its final year, the McKay Avenue School was closed on June 30, 1983.

Edmonton Public Schools Archives and Museum
The Edmonton Public Schools Archives and Museum is in the McKay Avenue School. The organization is a public research facility housing records and artifacts related to Edmonton Public Schools. It also offers curriculum-based, hands-on education programs for students and a museum highlighting the history of Edmonton Public Schools and Alberta's early political history. The museum features a 1950s-period schoolroom and the restored 1906 legislative assembly room. Between 2019 and 2020, the museum was the site of a traveling exhibition from the Anne Frank House.

Following flooding in February 2013, the McKay School was found have significant structural damage requiring $2.4-million in restoration. A fund raising campaign began with saw the Edmonton Public School Board, City of Edmonton, Government of Alberta, Government of Canada and private donors raise the necessary funds to repair the building by 2016. The renovated building reopened to the public in October 2018.

The museum also includes the original 1880s schoolhouse adjacent to the McKay Avenue School, which the McKay Avenue School replaced in 1905. The schoolhouse is used for museum education programs.

References

External links

Edmonton Public Schools Archives and Museum

Buildings and structures in Edmonton
Education in Edmonton
Museums in Edmonton
Municipal Historic Resources of Edmonton
Provincial Historic Resources in Edmonton